The Eisner Award for Best Digital Comic is an award for "creative achievement" in American comic books for material originally published digitally.

History and name change

Webcomics were eligible for the award when it was created in 2005. In 2014 the award was changed to Best Digital/Webcomic. In 2017 the award was split into Best Digital Comic and Best Webcomic.

Winners and nominees

Notes

References

Category
2005 establishments in the United States
Annual events in the United States
Awards established in 2005
Digital Comic
Webcomic awards